Macropelopia nebulosa is a species of fly in the family Chironomidae. It is found in the  Palearctic.

References

Tanypodinae
Insects described in 1804
Nematoceran flies of Europe